Choruk-e Pishkamar (also Romanized as Chorūk-e Pīshḵamar; also known as Chorūk) is a village in Zavkuh Rural District, Pishkamar District, Kalaleh County, Golestan Province, Iran. At the 2006 census, its population was 286, in 70 families.

References 

Populated places in Kalaleh County